Belyounech is a town and rural commune in the Tanger-Tétouan-Al Hoceïma region of Morocco. The city has many alternate transliterations, including Beliunech and Bel Younech.

Incidents involving the Ceuta border fence have had people trying to cross the border from the west side of the fence in Belyounech into Ceuta.

The community is a popular stop for people looking to ascend the The Dead Woman (Jebel Musa) because it is the nearest town to the base of the mountain.

History

Fishing 
The town has a strong fishing heritage, as it is situated on the coast of the Mediterranean Sea. The first women's fishing cooperative in Morocco is from Belyounech. There are also beaches available for recreation along the waters in Belyounech.

World heritage 
Belyounech was listed on the tentative list of sites considered for UNESCO's World Heritage Site designation in Morocco, but was removed in 1994.

See also 

External links 

 Belyounech, Morocco on Google Maps

References 

Tanger-Tetouan-Al Hoceima